Factorio is a construction and management simulation game developed by the Czech studio Wube Software. The game was announced via an Indiegogo crowdfunding campaign in 2013 and released for Windows, macOS, and Linux on 14 August 2020 following a four-year long early access phase to positive reviews. The game was released on Nintendo Switch on 28 October 2022.

The game follows an engineer who crash-lands on an alien planet and must harvest resources and create industry to build a rocket; however, as a sandbox game, players can continue the game past the end of the storyline. The game features both single-player and multiplayer modes.

Gameplay
Factorio is a construction and management simulation game focused on resource-gathering with real-time strategy and survival elements and influences from the BuildCraft and IndustrialCraft mods for the video game Minecraft. The player survives by locating and harvesting resources to craft various tools and machines, which in turn create more advanced materials that allow for the progression to more sophisticated technologies and machines. The game progresses as the player continues to build and manage their automated factory-style system, which automates the mining, transportation, processing, and assembly of resources and products. Players research advanced technologies that allow them to create new structures, items, and upgrades, starting with basic automation and eventually leading to oil refining, robots, and powered exoskeletons.

The game features a blueprint system, which allows for players to create reusable blueprints for factory parts. The blueprints consist of a baseline for construction, allowing for the copying of factory systems or entire factories, and subsequent construction.

The game is formally "won" by launching a rocket, although choosing to ignore this goal and instead continue building a factory is possible, as Factorio is an open world game. Constructing a rocket requires a massive amount of resources, motivating the player to set up a sizeable, effective factory in order to achieve this goal.

Combat
The player is tasked with defending themselves and their factory from the planet's indigenous fauna, known as 'Biters', 'Spitters', and 'Worms', who become increasingly hostile as pollutant emissions created by the player's factory increase, necessitating consideration of the balance between the player's production and the enemy's aggressiveness. The player can utilize defensive turrets, tanks, and other weapons to eliminate enemies. As the game progresses, enemies evolve and become harder to defeat.

Players may also elect to set the planet's fauna to "peaceful," during the start of the game. The fauna will still spawn, but will only attack the player and factory in retaliation from direct physical damage on themselves or a neighboring unit.

Multiplayer
Multiplayer mode allows people to play together cooperatively or versus one another both locally and via the Internet. Factorio supports both dedicated servers as well as player-hosted listen servers. In the past, the game used peer-to-peer connectivity, however this was removed as more robust options were developed. Saved world files can be seamlessly loaded in either single- or multiplayer. By default, all players on a server share technologies, unless a system of multiple teams has been instituted by the server host. Friendly fire is present. While the hard limit for number of players is 65,535 due to limitations of the SOCKET protocol, this number has never been reached; the most popular servers were able to successfully handle several hundred players at once. Players can share construction blueprints with other players on their server, via a public blueprint library.

Modding
Factorio is designed to be customisable via mods to create additional content, such as modifications to gameplay or re-texturing of visual elements. The developers offer an online portal on the Factorio website for mod developers to host their content. To help support the modding community, there is an in-game mod manager that allows players to quickly download them. Mods are written in Lua.

Development
The game has been developed by a team of developers from Prague, Czech Republic, since mid-2012. The development team originally consisted of a single person, but has grown larger. Wube Software was created in September 2014 by Michal Kovařík and Tomáš Kozelek in Prague. To fund the game the development team began an Indiegogo campaign, which started on 31 January 2013 and concluded on 3 March 2013. The campaign raised €21,626 of the €17,000 goal. Following the crowdfunding success, Wube sold early access editions of the game to raise further funds. The developer credits the April 2014 release of the game's trailer as a significant driver of those sales. As of March 2021, the team consists of 18 members.

Michal Kovařík, the game's lead designer, cited the IndustrialCraft and BuildCraft Minecraft mods for inspiration during the game's development.

The game was released on Steam as early access on 25 February 2016, but had been available to download from factorio.com since early on in development. It was officially released out of early access on 14 August 2020. It was originally planned to be released on 25 September 2020, but was moved up a month as to not compete with the release of Cyberpunk 2077, which, at the time, was scheduled to be released on 17 September 2020. In February 2021, the developers announced that 1.1 would be the final major update of the base game, and that a new expansion pack was being developed. On February 4th 2022, the developers revealed a planned price of $30.00 for the expansion pack, stating plans to make the expansion feel like an addition as big of the base game. A port of the game to Nintendo Switch was released on 28 October 2022.

G2A Audit
Video game key reseller G2A was accused of selling stolen keys on their site, affecting developers of games, specifically in the indie scene. On 5 July 2019, G2A offered to pay the developers of a game ten times the worth of the stolen game keys if the problem could be proven via audit. Wube was the only developer to call on this, stating "G2A - worse than piracy" and emailed a list of 321 canceled Steam keys due to chargebacks. After over ten months, G2A confirmed 198 of those keys were sold on the platform and paid Wube Software $39,600 as part of the promise. Due to the sensitive nature of the investigation, the audit was instead done internally.

Reception 

Factorio received positive reception from critics while still in early access. In the 2018 Steam Awards, Factorio was voted by Steam users as a runner-up in the "Most Fun with a Machine" category. By the beginning of 2020, the game had sold two million copies, by the beginning of 2021, the developers reported over two and a half million sold copies, and by its sixth anniversary in February 2022, the game had just passed 3.1 million copies sold.

Upon its release in 2020, Factorio received positive reviews. Rick Lane of PC Gamer praised Factorio, calling it "a manufacturing masterpiece". Nicolas Perez of Paste praised Factorio's use of early access, stating, "…Factorio has set an example of what the Early Access system is truly capable of." It was named IndieGameReviewer.com's Indie Game of the Year, after also naming it one its most anticipated in 2013. In 2021 Rock Paper Shotgun ranked Factorio the 7th best management game for the PC.

Legacy 
Neobuthus factorio is a species of scorpion from the family Buthidae found in Somaliland. It was named after the game by one of the researchers who first described the species, who is the father of the game's designer and co-director.

Satisfactory, a 2019 factory-building game by Coffee Stain Studios, has been compared to Factorio and described as a first-person, 3D interpretation of the game.

References

External links
 

2020 video games
Action video games
Construction and management simulation games
Early access video games
Indie video games
Linux games
Lua (programming language)-scripted video games
MacOS games
Multiplayer and single-player video games
Real-time strategy video games
Science fiction video games
Video games developed in the Czech Republic
Video games set in the future
Video games with isometric graphics
Windows games
Dieselpunk video games